Michelle Perrot (born 18 May 1928, Paris) is a French historian, and Professor emeritus of Contemporary History at the Paris Diderot University. She won the 2009 Prix Femina Essai.

Life
She has worked on the history of labor movements, and studied with Ernest Labrousse, with Michel Foucault, and with Robert Badinter.

She is a pioneer in the emergence of women's history and gender studies in France. She edited with Georges Duby, Histoire des femmes en Occident ("History of women in the West"; 5 vols.), Plon, 1990–1991).

Her work appears in Libération, and she produced and presented "History Mondays" (les lundis de l'histoire) on France Culture radio.

In 2014, she received the Simone de Beauvoir Prize.

For her, feminism is a universal freedom. She is co-author of the book "A History of Women in the West".

Works
Délinquance et système pénitentiaire en France au XIXe siècle, Annales: Économies, Sociétés, Civilisations, 1975.
Georges Duby & Michelle Perrot (eds.), Histoire des femmes en Occident, Paris: Plon, 1990–1991 (5 vols.)
Images de femmes, (co-written with) Georges Duby, Paris: Plon, 1992, 189 p.
Les femmes ou les silences de l'histoire, Paris: Flammarion, 1998.
Les Ombres de l’Histoire. Crime et châtiment au XIXe siècle, Paris: Flammarion, 2001.
Mon histoire des femmes, Paris: Éditions du Seuil, 2006, 251 p..
Histoire de chambres, Paris: Le Seuil, 2009 – Prix Femina Essai 2009.
George Sand à Nohant : Une maison d'artiste, 2018

In translation
 The Bedroom: An Intimate History, translated by Lauren Elkin, Yale University Press, 2018,

References

External links
"Rencontre avec Michelle Perrot, l'historienne des marges", Interdits, Dénètem et Sylvain, 6 February 2002.
"Entretien avec Michèle Perrot", multitudes, April 1993

1928 births
Writers from Paris
20th-century French historians
21st-century French historians
Labor historians
Prix Femina essai winners
Living people
Chevaliers of the Légion d'honneur
Officers of the Ordre national du Mérite